Anthribus nebulosus is a species of fungus weevil, family Anthribidae. It is found in Europe, Near East, and Northern Asia (excluding China) and, as an introduced species, in North America.

References

Further reading

 Arnett, R. H. Jr., M. C. Thomas, P. E. Skelley and J. H. Frank. (eds.). (21 June 2002). American Beetles, Volume II: Polyphaga: Scarabaeoidea through Curculionoidea. CRC Press LLC, Boca Raton, Florida .
 
 Richard E. White. (1983). Peterson Field Guides: Beetles. Houghton Mifflin Company.

Anthribidae
Beetles of Asia
Beetles of Europe
Beetles described in 1770
Taxa named by Johann Reinhold Forster